Harleton Independent School District is a public school district based in the community of Harleton, Texas (USA).

In 2009, the school district was rated "academically acceptable" by the Texas Education Agency.

Schools

Harleton High School (Grades 9-12)
Harleton Junior High School (Grades 6-8)
Harleton Elementary School (Grades PK-5)

References

External links
Harleton ISD - Home of the Wildcats

School districts in Harrison County, Texas